Karam Batth is an Indian-Canadian Punjabi actor and producer.

Batth will make his acting debut with self-produced biopic of the Indian boxer Kaur Singh, playing the lead role as Kaur Singh, in the film Padma Shri Kaur Singh. The film is expected to release in 2022.

Batth decided to produce this film after Indian actor Shah Rukh Khan came forward to help the boxer during a medical emergency.

References

Living people
Male actors in Punjabi cinema
21st-century Indian male actors
Male actors from Punjab, India
Year of birth missing (living people)